Azhar Abbas may refer to:
 Azhar Abbas (cricketer) (born 1975), Pakistani cricketer
 Azhar Abbas (journalist), Pakistani journalist
 Azhar Abbas (general), Pakistani general